The 2021 Porsche Carrera Cup Germany was the 36th season of the Porsche Carrera Cup Germany. The season began at Spa-Francorchamps on 30 April and ended at Hockenheim on 24 October. Races were held in Belgium, Germany, Austria, Italy and the Netherlands. This was also the first season that the new Porsche 911 GT3 Cup (Type 992) was used by all competitors.

Calendar

The initial calendar was released on 26 November 2020. On the 22nd July 2021 the ADAC announced to postpone the event on the Nürburgring because of the floods that happened in mid July in the Region around the Ring. That event was then taken of the schedule and replaced by an extra Monza round.

Entry List

Results
All results can be found here.

Standings
All standings can be found here.

Overall

Rookie

ProAm

Team

See also

 2021 Porsche Supercup

Notes

References

External links
Official Website

Porsche Carrera Cup Germany seasons
Porsche